Noah Babadi Kasule (born 15 May 1985) is an Ugandan footballer.

Career
Kasule began his career with Kampala City Council before moving to Uganda Revenue Authority SC. In 2007 Kasule moved to Armenia, spending four-year at Banants before spending three-years at Gandzasar Kapan and one-year at Ulisses.

Career statistics

International

Statistics accurate as of match played 31 May 2008

References

External links
 

1985 births
Living people
Ugandan footballers
Uganda international footballers
FC Urartu players
FC Gandzasar Kapan players
Expatriate footballers in Armenia
Armenian Premier League players
Kampala Capital City Authority FC players

Association football midfielders